Swiss Cycling is the national governing body of cycle racing in Switzerland.

The organisation is a member of the UCI and the UEC.

External links
 Swiss Cycling official website

National members of the European Cycling Union
Cycle racing organizations
Cycling
Cycle racing in Switzerland
Cycling